In Hinduism, Adityas, refers to the offspring of Aditi, the goddess representing the infinity. The name Aditya, in the singular, is taken to refer to the sun god Surya. Generally, Adityas are twelve in number and consists of Vivasvan, Aryaman, Tvashta, Savitr, Bhaga, Dhata, Mitra, Varuna, Amsa, Pushan, Indra and Vishnu (in the form of Vamana).

They appear in the Rig Veda, where there are 6–8 in number, all male. The number increases to 12 in the Brahmanas. The Mahabharata and the Puranas mention the sage Kashyapa  as their father. In each month of the year a different Aditya is said to shine.

Sun worship

Characterisation

The Aditya have been described in the Rig Veda as bright and pure as streams of water, free from all guile and falsehood, blameless, perfect.

This class of deities has been seen as upholding the movables and immovable Dharma.
Adityas are beneficent gods who act as protectors of all beings, who are provident and guard the world of spirits and protect the world. In the form of Mitra-Varuna, the Adityas are true to the eternal Law and act as the exactors of debt.

In present-day usage in Sanskrit, the term Aditya has been made singular in contrast to Vedic Adityas, and are being used synonymously with Surya, the Sun. The twelve Adityas are believed to represent the twelve months in the calendar and the twelve aspects of Sun. Since they are twelve in number, they are referred as DvadashAdityas.

The 12 Ādityás are basically the monthly suns, corresponding to the approximately 12 lunations in a solar year. These are also called the 12 purushas, pertaining to the 12 lunar months of the year. Here the months refer to the lunar months. In astronomy the lunar months with a solar sankranti are said to have an Aditya or purusha. The month without a sankranti is said to be neuter and is said to be an extra month or the intercalary lunar month.

Mentions in Hindu scriptures
 
 

The Ādityas are one of the principal deities of the Vedic classical Hinduism belonging to the solar class. In the Vedas, numerous hymns are dedicated to Mitra, Varuna, Savitr, etc.

In hymn 7.99 of the Rigveda, Indra-Vishnu produces the sun, his discus a vestige of his solar creation, equivalent to the sun. The Vishnu purana identifies the Discus chakra with the following: 'thoughts, like the chakra, flow faster than even the mightiest wind.'

The Gayatri mantra, which is regarded as one of the most sacred of the Vedic hymns is dedicated to Savitr, one of the principal Ādityas. The Adityas are a group of solar deities, from the Brahmana period numbering twelve. The ritual of Surya Namaskaar, performed by Hindus, is an elaborate set of hand gestures and body movements, designed to greet and revere the Sun.

The sun god in Hinduism is an ancient and revered deity. In later Hindu usage, all the Vedic Ādityas lost identity and metamorphosed into one composite deity, Surya, the Sun. The attributes of all other Ādityas merged into that of Surya and the names of all other Ādityas became synonymous with, or epithets of, Surya.

The Ramayana has Rama as a direct descendant of the Surya, thus belonging to the Suryavamsha or the Solar dynasty. The Mahabharata describes one of its warrior heroes, Karna, as being the son of the Pandava mother Kunti and Surya.

The sun god is said to be married to the goddess Sanjnya. She is depicted in dual form, being both sunlight and shadow, personified. The goddess is revered in Gujarat and Rajasthan.

The charioteer of Surya is Aruna, who is also personified as the redness that accompanies the sunlight in dawn and dusk. The sun god is driven by a seven-horsed Chariot depicting the seven days of the week and the seven colours of rainbow which are seen due to the dispersion by Surya's rays.

Surya Namaskaram 

Surya Namaskaram, the Salute to the Sun or Sun Salutation, is worship of sun which is also included as a practice in yoga as exercise incorporating a flow sequence of some twelve gracefully linked asanas. Similar exercises were in use in India, for example among wrestlers. The basic sequence involves moving from a standing position into Downward and Upward Dog poses and then back to the standing position, but many variations are possible. The set of 12 asanas is dedicated to the solar deity Surya. In some Indian traditions, the positions are each associated with a different mantra.

Sun worship festivals 

Makar Sankranti is a festival dedicated to sun worship in India and by the hindu diaspora of India.

Chhath (Hindi: छठ, also called Dala Chhath) is an ancient Hindu festival dedicated to Surya, the chief solar deity, unique to Bihar, Jharkhand and the Terai. This major festival is also celebrated in the northeast region of India, Madhya Pradesh, Uttar Pradesh, and parts of Chhattisgarh. Hymns to the Sun can be found in the Vedas, the oldest sacred texts of Hinduism. Practiced in different parts of India, the worship of the Sun has been described in the Rigveda. There is another festival called Sambha-Dasami, which is celebrated in the state of Odisha for the surya.

The sun is prayed to by South Indians during the harvest festival. In Tamil Nadu, the Tamil people worship the sun god during the Tamil month of Thai, after a year of crop farming. The month is known as the harvesting month and people pay respects to the sun on the first day of the Thai month known as Thai pongal, or Pongal, which is a four-day celebration. It is one of the few indigenous worship by the Tamil people irrespective of religion.

Names of solar deities

Rigveda

In the Rigveda, the Adityas are seven or eight in number and include:

 Varuna
 Mitra 
 Aryaman
 Daksha
 Bhaga
 Amsha
 Savitr or Surya
 Sometimes Martanda

Brahmanas

In the Satapatha Brahmana, the number of Adityas is eight in some passages, and in other texts of the same Brahmana, twelve Adityas are mentioned. The list of 12 Adityas is as follows:

 Yama
 Aryaman
 Indra
 Ravi
 
 
 Bhaga
 
 Sūrya or Arka
 
 Mitra

Upanishads

His mother is Aditi.

Vishnu Purana

The Adityas in the Vishnu Purana are:

 Vishnu
 Aryaman
 Śakra
 
 
 Dhūti
 Bhaga
 
 Vivasvat
 
 Mitra

Bhagavata Purana

In the Bhagavata Purana, the Adityas are associated with each month of the year, it is a different Aditya who shines as the Sun-God (Surya).

Linga Purana

According to the Linga Purana, the Adityas are:

 Brahma
 Vishnu
 Indra
 
 
 Dhata
 Bhaga
 
 Vivasvat
 Amshuman
 Mitra

Aditya as nakshatra devatas 

Adityas are responsible for proper functioning of the universe and in Hindu cosmology they are given lordship over celestial constellations, called nakshatras in Jyotish. Nakshatras are forces of universal intelligence which are intertwined with the birth-death cycle of life, identity of all created beings, events and day to day consciousness in our lives.  In India, at Konark, in the state of Odisha, a temple is dedicated to Surya. The Konark Sun Temple has been declared a UNESCO World Heritage Site. Surya is the most prominent of the navagrahas or nine celestial objects of the Hindus. Navagrahas can be found in almost all Hindu temples. 

Adityas manage the Shakti of the nakshatras. Here are few examples.

 Bhaga has lordship over Purva Phalguni nakshatra. Bhaga is bestower of fortune. Bhaga in Sanskrit means "a portion" so our portion in life is regulated by this divine celestial being. Many a times this is related to fortunate marriages, or fortune from marriage and partnerships. It is a very worldly nakshatra bestowing divine intelligence with respect to worldly gains in life. Beings born when Purva Phalguni is rising in the east are literal physical manifestation of this energy.
 Aryama, the God of Patronage, is an Aditya who is the lord of Uttar Phalguni nakshatra and as suggested by the name, a person born under the auspices of Aryama finds many lucky opportunities with benefactors in their lives, among many other qualities that are possessed by this divine being.
 Savitur, rules over Hasta Nakshatra and is the cheerful Aditya who manages worldly skills and artistry. Handiwork of all kinds, from needlework, pottery making to technical skills industry, sleight of hand pick pockets, magicians, and Reiki masters all are blessed by the divine intelligence and benevolence of this Aditya.
 Mitra, rules over Anuradha nakshatra they are the peacekeepers of this world.
 Varuna, rules over Shatbhishak nakshatra the nakshatra of 1000 healers and gives a person intelligence about all sorts of medicine. Varuna as its ruling Aditya is lord keeper of law, hence themes of crime and punishment, law and order fall under his rulership. Varuna in RigVeda is to be feared and not taken lightly.

This makes Vedic Adityas not some conceptual, abstract, or mythological characters in a story book, but part of the visible cosmology and the everyday realities of our daily lives. We manifest their qualities in our lives and as such are part of the divine ourselves.

See also

 Sun worship in Hinduism
 Aditi
 List of solar deities in Hinduism
 List of Surya temples
 Surya Namaskar

 Other related
 Ashvins
 Prajapati
 Rudras
 Vasus
 List of Hindu deities
 List of Hindu temples
 List of Hindu pilgrimage sites

Further reading

Notes

References

External links

Hindu deities
Hindu temples
Hindu pilgrimage sites
 
Solar gods
Rigvedic deities